Nuevo Laredo is a city in the Municipality of Nuevo Laredo in the Mexican state of Tamaulipas. The city lies on the banks of the Rio Grande, across from Laredo, United States. The 2010 census population of the city was 373,725. Nuevo Laredo is part of the Laredo-Nuevo Laredo Metropolitan Area with a population of 636,516. Both the city and the municipality rank as the third largest in the state.

The city is connected to Laredo, United States by three international bridges and a rail bridge. The city is larger and younger than its US counterpart. As an indication of its economic importance, one of Mexico's banderas monumentales is in the city (these banderas have been established in state capitals and cities of significance).

History
Nuevo Laredo was part of the territory of the original settlement of Laredo (now in Texas) which was founded in 1755 by the Spaniard Don Tomás Sánchez in the northern part of the Rio Grande. The settlement's territory was granted to José de Escandón by the King of Spain, and the settlement's territory and population remained unified for ninety years, until the war of 1846–1848, the Mexican–American War.

Early in 1848, the Treaty of Guadalupe Hidalgo divided the territory attached to Laredo between the United States (Texas) and Mexico (Tamaulipas). Nuevo Laredo was founded on June 15, 1848, by seventeen Laredo families who wished to remain Mexican and therefore moved to the Mexican side of the Rio Grande. They identified with Mexico, its history, and its cultural customs, and decided to keep their Mexican citizenship. The founders of Nuevo Laredo even took with them the bones of their ancestors so they would continue to rest in Mexican ground.

A shortage of natural gas led to blackouts in Texas and along the border during the February 13–17, 2021 North American winter storm. Millions on both sides of the border were left without gas or electricity, heat or running water. Factories and restaurants were forced to close, and people lost their jobs. Mayor Enrique Rivas Cuéllar called upon the population not to panic. Also, as of February 19, 2021, Nuevo Laredo reported 4,714 cases of COVID-19.

Drug-related violence

As a border town, Nuevo Laredo is known for its turf war in which drug cartels compete for control of the drug trade into the United States. Nuevo Laredo is a lucrative drug corridor because of the large volume of trucks that pass through the area, and the multiple exploitable ports of entry.

Nuevo Laredo is the base of Los Zetas, originally the armed wing of the Gulf Cartel; the two organizations separated in early 2010 and have been fighting for the control of the smuggling routes to the United States. As of 2012, Los Zetas are thought to be Mexico's largest criminal organization. Drug violence involving the Sinaloa and Gulf Cartels escalated in 2003, when the city was controlled by the Gulf Cartel. 2012 saw an unprecedented series of mass murder attacks in the city between the Sinaloa Cartel and Gulf Cartel on one side and Los Zetas on the other.

Geography
Nuevo Laredo is in the northern tip of Tamaulipas on the west end of the Rio Grande Plains. The Rio Grande is the only source that supplies its citizens with water. El Coyote Creek supplies Nuevo Laredo's only natural lake El Laguito (The Small Lake).  The area consists of a few hills and flat land covered with grass, oak, and mesquite.

Climate 
Nuevo Laredo features a semi-arid climate. Nuevo Laredo's weather is influenced by its proximity to the Chihuahuan Desert to the west, by the Sierra Madre Oriental mountains to the south and west, and by the Gulf of Mexico to the east. Much of the moisture from the Pacific is blocked by the Sierra Madre Oriental. Therefore, most of the moisture derives from the Gulf of Mexico. Its geographic location causes Nuevo Laredo's weather to range from long periods of heat to sudden violent storms in a short period of time.

As Laredo sometimes undergoes  drought, a water conservation ordinance was implemented in 2003.

Government 
Nuevo Laredo is governed by an elected Cabildo, which is composed of the Presidente Municipal (Municipal President or Mayor), two Síndicos,  and twenty Regidores. The PAN is in control of the city government. The Mayor is in charge of the municipal administration. The Síndicos supervise the municipal budget and expenditures, and the Regidores are elected by the party.

Public safety 
Public safety is provided by three municipal departments: (1) municipal police (Dirección de Seguridad Ciudadana), (2) traffic control (Dirección de Seguridad Vial), and (3) the emergency services department (Dirección de Protección Civil, Bomberos y Desastres).

As well as the State Police Force Tamaulipas ("Fuerza Tamaulipas") replacing former Acreditable State Police ("Polícia Estatal Acreditable")

Because of the drug-related violence, Federal level departments take part in the security effort, SEDENA Military Police ("Polícia Military") Mexican Army Troops, SEMAR Mexican Navy Troops and Federal Police.

Economy

Nuevo Laredo (along with Laredo, Texas) is the most important trade border crossing of Latin America (approximately 8500 trucks cross the border each day). Its geographical position has enabled this city to grow and specialize in the international trade business. Nuevo Laredo has a very developed logistics and transportation industry, complemented with a variety of hotel chains, restaurants and a cultural center where events such as the Tamaulipas International Festival take place.

Nuevo Laredo is on the primary trade route connecting Canada, the United States and Mexico. Both Nuevo Laredo and Laredo, Texas are now the gateway to Mexico's burgeoning industrial complex, offering diverse markets, business opportunities and profit potential, which both business and industry cannot find anywhere else. Nuevo Laredo is the only Mexico/U.S. border city strategically positioned at the convergence of all land transportation systems. The main highway and railroad leading from Central Mexico through Mexico City, San Luis Potosí, Saltillo and Monterrey join with two major U.S. rail lines at Nuevo Laredo and major American highway Interstate 35, thus offering fast access to the most important metropolitan areas and seaports of Texas, as well as northern states and Canada. For more than a decade, Mexico's economic policies have greatly increased Mexico/U.S. trade and cross-border production in the Nuevo Laredo area.

There are three bridges in the Nuevo Laredo area:  International Bridge #1 (the oldest); International Bridge #2 (also known as Juarez-Lincoln; no pedestrians); International Bridge #3 (also known as the Free Trade or Libre Comercio Bridge; inaugurated in 1999; cargo only). Also the Colombia-Solidarity (Solidaridad) Bridge (located about  NW of the city in Colombia, Nuevo León). There are no urban areas on either side of this bridge.

Nuevo Laredo is a strategic investment point. On this site there are six recognized industrial parks: Oradel Industrial Center, Longoria Industrial Park, Rio Bravo Industrial Park, Modulo Industrial America, FINSA Industrial Park, and Industrial Park Pyme.

Education

The educational infrastructure amounted to 288 school sites which are 71 kindergartens, 148 elementary schools, 34 junior high schools, 14 high schools, 13 vocational schools and 12 universities.

Higher education

There are twelve universities in Nuevo Laredo. Undergraduate studies normally last at least 3 years, divided into semesters or quarters, depending on the college or university.

Every graduate gets a bachelor's degree (Licenciatura or Ingenieria). Some of these universities also offer postgraduate studies. A "maestría" is a 2-year degree after a bachelor's degree, which awards the title of Master (Maestro).

Universidad Autónoma de Tamaulipas (UAT) It has 2 faculties. The faculty of commerce, administration and social sciences offers bachelor's degrees in: International trade, Computing, Business administration, Law, and Accountancy. The faculty of nursing offers bachelor's degrees in: Nursing, Health, safety and environment.
Instituto Tecnologico de Nuevo Laredo (ITNL) offers bachelor's degrees in: Architecture, Civil engineering, Electrical engineering, Computer systems engineering, Industrial engineering, Mechanical engineering, Business administration, Accountancy, Electronic engineering, Mechatronics engineering, and Enterprise management engineering.
Universidad Valle del Bravo-Valle de Mexico (UVB-UVM) offers bachelor's degrees in: Law, Psychology, Graphic design, International trade, International marketing, Business administration, Tourism, International relations, Communications, Accountancy, Political sciences, Industrial administration engineering, Computer systems engineering, Electronic systems engineering, Civil engineering, Environmental engineering, Mechanical electrician engineering, Security and industrial hygiene engineering, Dentistry.
Universidad Tecnologica de Nuevo Laredo (UT) offers bachelor's degrees in: Enterprise development engineering, Global commercial logistics engineering, Industrial maintenance engineering, Mechatronics engineering, Renewable energy engineering. Also offers associate degrees in: Logistic and Autotransport administration, tariff classification and customs clearance, Electronics and automated, Industrial maintenance, Sales and Distribution.
Centro de Estudios Superiores Royal (CES-R, Royal University) offers bachelor's degrees in: International trade, Marketing and publicity, Business administration, Computer systems engineering, Organizational psychology, Accountancy.
Instituto de Ciencias y Estudios Superiores de Tamaulipas (ICEST) offers bachelor's degrees in: Communications, Nutrition, Criminology, Psychology, Languages, International trade, Dramatic literature and theater, Chemical pharmacist biologist, Nursing, Library science, Tourism, Computer systems engineering, Chemical engineering.
Universidad TecMilenio (UTM) offers bachelor's degrees in: Business administration, Intelligence of markets, International trade, Graphic design and animation, Industrial engineering, Logistics systems engineering, Development of software engineering, International businesses engineering.
Universidad Del Norte De Tamaulipas (UNT) offers bachelor's degrees in: Political sciences and administration, Administration and marketing, International trade and customs, Computer systems engineering, Accountancy.
Universidad Panamericana (UP) offers bachelor's degrees in: Business administration, Accountancy, Law, Junior high education, Kindergarten education, Civic and ethical, Psychology, Surgeon (obstetrician), Surgeon (zootechnician), Industrial engineering, Computer systems engineering.

Nuevo Laredo has three teacher training programs:

Normal Básica Cuauhtemoc offers bachelor's degrees in: Elementary education, and Kindergarten education.
Normal Superior De Tamaulipas opened its doors in August 2005 and offers bachelor's degrees in: Physical education, and Junior high education.  Also offers specialities in Spanish, mathematics, and English instruction.
Universidad Pedagógica Nacional (UPN) offers bachelor's degrees in: Education, Educational intervention.

Transportation

Air
Nuevo Laredo is served by the Quetzalcóatl International Airport with daily flights to Mexico City. The neighboring Laredo International Airport in Laredo, Texas has daily flights to Houston (George Bush Intercontinental Airport) and to Dallas/Fort Worth International Airport and Tri-weekly flights to Las Vegas, Nevada and bi-weekly seasonal (May–August) flights to Orlando, Florida.

Mass transit
Transporte Urbano de Nuevo Laredo (TUNL) is the mass transit system that operates in Nuevo Laredo with fixed routes with millions of passengers per year. TUNL works with a fleet of fixed-route buses. TUNL hub is located in downtown Nuevo Laredo.

 Ruta 1  Guerrero	
 Ruta 2 20 De Noviembre – Campanario	
 Ruta 2 20 De Noviembre – Valles De Anáhuac	
 Ruta 3  5 Colonias Azul	
 Ruta 3a  5 Colonias Verde	
 Ruta 4 Colonia Las Torres – Panteón – Puente	
 Ruta 5 Victoria – Viveros – Verde	
 Ruta 5a Victoria – Viveros – Azul	
 Ruta 6 Rivereña – Buenavista – Centro	
 Ruta 7 Mina – Constitucional	
 Ruta 7a Olivos X Arteaga - Cortes Villada – Mina – Constituciónal	
 Ruta 8 Mirador – Panteón	
 Ruta 8 Mirador – Reforma	
 Ruta 10 Kilometro 15 – Colonia Primavera – Kilometro 18	
 Ruta 11 Carretera – Colonia Burócrata – Centro	
 Ruta 12 Laredo Tx – Benito Juárez	
 Ruta 12 Laredo Tx – Issste	
 Ruta 13 Valles De Anáhuac – Conalep	
 Ruta 13 Valles De San Miguel – Valles De Anáhuac	
 Ruta 13a Campanario – Conalep	
 Ruta 15 Cavazos Lerma 	
 Ruta 17 Granjas – Fracc. Itavu – Km 13 – Km 18 – Centro	
 Ruta 17a Granjas – Fracc. Itavu – Km 13 – Km 18 – Centro	
 Ruta 17b  Km 13 – Santa Cecilia	
 Ruta 19  Unión Del Recuerdo	
 Ruta 19a Colonia Los Artistas – Naciones Unidas – Centro	
 Ruta 20 Cortes Villada – La Sandia – Joya – Centro	
 Ruta 21 Rivereña – Virreyes	
 Ruta 22 Las Torres – Panteón – Bolívar – Centro	
 Ruta 22a Las Torres – Panteón – Bolívar – Centro	
 Ruta 23 Mina - Voluntad y Trabajo 2 y 3	
 Ruta 24 Voluntad - Nueva Era-Buenos Aires por Independencia	
 Ruta 24a Voluntad – Nueva Era – Buenos Aires Por Independencia	
 Ruta 28 Las Alazanas	
 Ruta 29 Reservas Territoriales – Colonia Hipódromo – Centro	
 Ruta 30 Reservas Territoriales – Colonia Buenos Aires – Centro	
 Ruta 31 Reservas Territoriales – Conalep	
 Ruta 32 Colonia Insurgentes – Conalep – 150 Aniversario	
 Ruta 35 Kilometro 10 – Panteón – Colinas Del Sur	
 Ruta 35a Kilometro 10 – Panteón – Colinas Del Sur	
 Ruta 36 Fraccionamiento América – Nogal – La Concordia – Centro	
 Ruta 36a Fraccionamiento América – Nogal por Coca-Cola

International bridges
Gateway to the Americas International Bridge
Juárez-Lincoln International Bridge
World Trade International Bridge (commercial traffic only)
Texas-Mexican Railway International Bridge

Major highways
Major highways in Nuevo Laredo and their starting and ending points:
 Mexican Federal Highway 85 Nuevo Laredo-Mexico City
 Mexican Federal Highway 2 Matamoros-Nuevo Laredo-Colombia-Ciudad Acuña
Tamaulipas State Highway 1 Nuevo Laredo-Monterrey
Nuevo León State Highway Spur 1 Colombia-Anáhuac

Nearby cities

People and culture

Parks and zoos
Parque Viveros (en:Viveros Park) is a  forest park that overlooks the Rio Grande on the eastern side of Nuevo Laredo. The park features a zoo, two large swimming pools, walking trails, and picnic areas with barbecue pits and playgrounds.

Theaters
Nuevo Laredo has three main theaters the "Centro Cultural", "Teatro de la Ciudad", and "Casa de Cultura". The Centro Cultural (en:Cultural Center), is Nuevo Laredo's main theater with a sitting capacity of 1,200 guests. The theater has presented high level shows high level, plays, concerts and dance recitals and one independent Art Gallery "Casa Black" that opens 2 times a year for a single weekend. The theater has a museum, library, and a cafeteria. The Teatro de la Ciudad (en:City Theater) is a theater which presents plays, dance recitals, concerts and musical shows and special events. The Casa de Cultura (en:House of Culture) houses music, painting, dance and literature workshops and also presents major artistic and cultural events such as art exhibitions, concerts, film samples, dance recitals and plays, among others.

Sports

Baseball 

The Tecolotes de los Dos Laredos (Owls of the Two Laredos) are a team in the Mexican Baseball League who split their games between Nuevo Laredo and Laredo, Texas. The Tecolotes were the Mexican League Champions in 1953, 1954, 1958, 1977, and 1989 and runner-ups in 1945, 1955, 1959, 1985, 1987, 1992, 1993.

Their games in Nuevo Laredo are played in Parque la Junta, which opened in 1947 and has a capacity of 6,000 people. The team left the park in 2003 for Estadio Nuevo Laredo, located on the west side of the city, a move that was criticized. In 2019, Parque la Junta was refurbished to once again host the Tecolotes.

Football 
The Bravos de Nuevo Laredo is a football club in the Tercera División in Nuevo Laredo. The Unidad Deportiva Benito Juárez (Benito Juárez Sport Complex) is their home stadium. The Bravos are an institution formed in 2004 by a groups of business people in Nuevo Laredo, whose objective is to organize a football team in the city with aspirations it will become a professional football club.  This has been the first team to have all of their games transmitted live via internet through www.arcanasa.com up to the end of the 2010 tournament.

The Ciudad Deportiva (Sports City) is a sports complex built in 2007 which main feature is a baseball park in Nuevo Laredo, Mexico. It is home to the Tecolotes de Nuevo Laredo Mexican Baseball League team.  The Ciudad Deportiva can seat up to 12,000 fans at a baseball game. Phase one of this project has been completed which only included the Baseball Park. Phase II of this project will include a new soccer stadium within Mexican Primera Division standards for a possible expansion of one of its teams to Nuevo Laredo. Phase II also includes a gym that will seat 1,500 fans to enjoy basketball, volleyball, and gymnastics among other sports.

Basketball 
The Toros de Nuevo Laredo is a basketball team in Nuevo Laredo, playing in the Mexican professional league Liga Nacional de Baloncesto Profesional (LNBP). The Toros de Nuevo Laredo play in the Ciudad Deportiva Indoor Stadium. They entered the league in 2009 to join the North Conference. Prior to the Toros de Nuevo Laredo, Nuevo Laredo had the Venados de Nuevo Laredo which played on the LNBP for the 2007–2008 season.

Entertainment 

The city has a variety of tourist attractions such as:

 Cultural Center. Opened in 2004, the cultural center has a main theater, experimental theater, natural history museum, Reyes Meza museum, gourmet restaurant, cafeteria, temporary exhibition area, library, book shop, media library, and Uxmal walk where there are pre-Columbian works of art with colossal sculptures of gods and idols of the Mesoamerican cultures.
 Natural history museum. It was opened in 2007, in its permanent museum exposes human skeletons, dinosaur bones and fossils in general that allows to make a chronological history travel of the region, fauna, flora and geography, from the jurassic to our era.
 Jose Reyes Meza Museum. Opened in June 2008 It has the name of a remarkable painter, designer and muralist from Tamaulipas, the museum exposes various plastic works.
 Regional Zoo. It has a wide range of animal species from different ecosystems and from the region, it is located next to the Ecological Park "Viveros" and receives hundreds of visitors daily.
 Word Station Gabriel García Márquez. Dedicated to the writer Gabriel García Márquez, Nobel laureate in literature, this cultural space opened in September 2008 and has an auditorium, exhibition gallery, library, reading rooms, children's room, literary coffee and a book shop.
 The House of Culture. It has the theater "Lucio Blanco", in the house of culture occur cultural events, also there are classes of music, painting, dance and literature.
 Old Customs Building. The building was restored and adapted to serve as a cultural space, with the concert hall "Sergio Pena," the great forum and an exhibitions gallery .
 Longoria bank museum. It was built in 1929 by Don Octavio Longoria, currently its lobby is used to exhibit plastic arts and photography.
 Historical Archive. In it lies the documentary and graphic memory of the city, also has temporary exhibitions, consultation area, audiovisual area and the site museum which displays railroad artifacts, photographs and documents of time alluding to the history of the Railroad in Nuevo Laredo.
 Viveros Park. The park has playgrounds, a driver education park, Camécuaro pool, green areas, the regional zoo, an aquarium, a jurassic park.
 IMSS theater. It presents plays, musicals, movies and other events.
 Sports city (ciudad deportiva). It has a baseball stadium, the multidisciplinary gymnasium of basketball, tennis courts, squash courts and soccer court
 Market Maclovio Herrera. It is located in the historic city center, here you can find many kinds of Mexican crafts from all the country, e.g. costumes, jewelry, traditional Mexican candies and piñatas.
 Narciso Mendoza park. It has the Fidel Cuellar library, a walking trail around the park (circuit almost 800 m), a FutRap court and a playground .
 Adolfo Lopez Mateos city theater.
 Recreational park El Laguito.
 Art Gallery "Casa Black".
 Polyforum Dr. Rodolfo Torre Cantu. A place to hold events and mass entertainment was opened on September 4, 2013. It has the capacity to hold over 5,000 people and parking for over 1,000 vehicles. The project is still under construction and includes a civic center, stage performances, cultural walk, aquarium, soccer fields and basketball courts and more.

There is a fairly large array of night-time entertainment venues. Most establishments (clubs, bars, and restaurants) are located in the historical district.  Other restaurants (including chains such as Carl's Jr., Burger King, Kentucky Fried Chicken, and McDonald's) are located along Avenida Vicente Guerrero and Avenida Reforma. Nuevo Laredo has a red light district called Boy's Town, (or "La Zona").

The city has some malls like Paseo Reforma, it was opened in May 2008, this mall has many commercial establishments, like Wal-Mart Super Center, The Home Depot, and Cinépolis. Other shopping centers are, Plaza Real, Plaza 2 Laredos, Plaza commercial La fe.

Media

Newspapers

AM radio

Long-range AM stations
The following Clear Channel AM stations can be heard in Laredo:

FM radio

Television

Notable people
Norma Elia Cantú - Postmodernist writer and professor of English
Mauricio González de la Garza - Journalist, writer and music composer
Laredo Kid - Masked Professional Wrestler
Arturo Santos Reyes - Boxer
Miguel Treviño Morales, Mexican drug kingpin, leader of Los Zetas Cartel and older brother of Omar Treviño Morales
Omar Treviño Morales, Mexican drug kingpin, leader of Los Zetas Cartel and younger brother of Miguel Treviño Morales
Iván Velázquez Caballero, Mexican drug kingpin and leader of Los Zetas Cartel

See also 

Oradel Industrial Center

References

External links
 
 Ayuntamiento de Nuevo Laredo Official website (español)

 
Populated places in Tamaulipas
Laredo–Nuevo Laredo
Divided cities
Mexico–United States border crossings
Populated places established in 1755
1755 establishments in New Spain
Tamaulipas populated places on the Rio Grande